WMQ may refer to:

The William and Mary Quarterly, a quarterly history journal in the United States
IBM WebSphere MQ, a family of network communication software products launched by IBM